Lafoensia replicata is a species of plant in the family Lythraceae. It is endemic to Brazil.  It is threatened by habitat loss.

References

Endemic flora of Brazil
replicata
Vulnerable plants
Taxonomy articles created by Polbot